Gauruncus intermedius is a species of moth of the family Tortricidae. It is endemic to Ecuador (Tungurahua Province).

References

External links

Moths described in 2002
Endemic fauna of Ecuador
Euliini
Moths of South America
Taxa named by Józef Razowski